John Sylvester Hall (January 9, 1924 – January 17, 1995) was a pitcher in Major League Baseball. He pitched in three games for the 1948 Brooklyn Dodgers.

External links

Major League Baseball pitchers
Brooklyn Dodgers players
1924 births
1995 deaths
Baseball players from Oklahoma
Abilene Blue Sox players
Mobile Bears players
Montreal Royals players
Montgomery Rebels players
Montgomery Grays players